The Butcher is a 2007 South Korean horror film directed by Kim Jin-won and produced by Choi Gong-jae. The film starring Kim Sung-il, You Dong-hun in the lead roles.

Cast
 You Dong-hun
 Kim Sung-il

Reception
James Mudge called the film, "An incredibly visceral experience and the closest a viewer can get to actually feeling tortured - this can be taken as either as a warning or a recommendation."

References

External links
 

2000s Korean-language films
South Korean horror films
2007 films
2007 horror films
2000s South Korean films